is a Japanese politician and the current governor of Nara Prefecture in Japan, first elected in 2007. A graduate of the University of Tokyo, he joined the Ministry of Transport, attending Maxwell School of Citizenship and Public Affairs Syracuse University as a ministry official. Leaving the ministry in 2001, he was elected to the House of Councillors in the Diet of Japan (national legislature) for the first time in the same year.

References

External links 
 Official website  

1945 births
Living people
People from Yao, Osaka
Politicians from Nara Prefecture
University of Tokyo alumni
Maxwell School of Citizenship and Public Affairs alumni
Members of the House of Councillors (Japan)
Governors of Nara Prefecture